Datai Subdistrict is a subdistrict on central Mentougou District, Beijing, China. It borders Yanchi and Wanping Towns in the north, Wanping and Yongding Towns in the east, Fozizhuang and Da'anshan Towns in the south, and Zhaitang Town in the west. In the year 2020, the population for this subdistrict was 3,728.

History

Administrative divisions 
In the year 2021, Datai Subdistrict comprised nine communities:

See also 

 List of township-level divisions of Beijing

References 

Mentougou District
Subdistricts of Beijing